Eren Ozmen (born 1958/1959) is a billionaire Turkish-American businesswoman, and the majority co-owner and president of the private aerospace and defense company, Sierra Nevada Corporation (SNC).

Early life and education
In the early 1980s, Eren Ozmen came to the US from Turkey to pursue higher education. In 1985, she earned an MBA from the University of Nevada, Reno and in 1988, she joined SNC.

Career
Ozmen and her husband Fatih Ozmen acquired Sierra Nevada Corporation in 1994. Under the Ozmens, SNC has acquired 19 companies in 34 locations in 19 US states, England, Germany and Turkey, and has grown to include a workforce of over 3,000 personnel.

Ozmen has prioritized maintaining a healthy work-life balance by promoting family-friendly policies within the corporate culture. In 1991 she established an on-site daycare for employees.

In 2017, Eren and Fatih Ozmen launched Ozmen Ventures, a seed and early-stage venture capital fund headquartered in Reno. The $5 million fund aims to invest in young and dynamic local startups and cultivate the local entrepreneurial ecosystem.

Philanthropy
In 2014, Eren and Fatih Ozmen donated $5 million to the University of Nevada, Reno to create a permanent center for entrepreneurship at the university’s college of business. The Ozmen Center for Entrepreneurship supports and enhances the university’s entrepreneurial programs in order to stimulate the creation of new business ventures.

In May 2016, the Ozmen Center for Entrepreneurship launched a Women's Initiative aimed at connecting innovative female entrepreneurs with leaders and established professionals and business owners in the community. It also highlights female business achievements in and around the community.

Awards and recognition
 "Meet the woman behind this spaceship" — ShareAmerica.gov (Aug 2017)
 "America’s Richest Self-Made Women" — Forbes (May 2017)
 Aviation Entrepreneurs of the Year
 Living Legends of Aviation
 Carnegie Corporation of New York, "Great Immigrants, Great Americans" (2017)
 Most Influential Turkish-American Woman, No. 2 TurkOfAmerica
 Top 10 Most Influential Turkish Americans, TurkOfAmerica
 Honorary doctorate, University of Nevada, Reno (2016)
 Ozmen was selected for the inaugural 2021 Forbes 50 Over 50; made up of entrepreneurs, leaders, scientists and creators who are over the age of 50.

Personal life
She is married to Fatih Ozmen, they have two children, and live in Reno, Nevada.

References

1950s births
Year of birth missing (living people)
Living people
21st-century American businesspeople
American aerospace businesspeople
American billionaires
American chairpersons of corporations
American philanthropists
American technology chief executives
Businesspeople in information technology
Space advocates
Turkish emigrants to the United States
Female billionaires